A clock tower is an architectural structure housing a turret clock.

Clock Tower may also refer to:

Buildings 
 Abraj Al Bait, Mecca, also known as the Clock Towers
 Clock Tower, Anantapur
 Clock Tower of Ateca
 Clock Tower, Brighton
 Clock Tower, Erode
 Clock Tower, Faisalabad
 Clock Tower, Herne Bay
 Clock Tower, Hong Kong
 Clock Tower (Iquique)
 Clock Tower, Korçë
 Clock Tower of Murshidabad
 Clock Tower (Podgorica)
 Clock Tower (Rome, Georgia)
 Clock Tower, Sialkot
 Clock Tower, St Albans
 Clock Tower, Tirana
 Clock Tower of Ulcinj
 Clock Tower (Westminster), the former name of the tower containing Big Ben
 Deira Clocktower
 The Clocktower (restaurant), restaurant in New York, USA

Arts, entertainment and media 

 Clock Tower (series), a horror adventure video game series
 Clock Tower (1995 video game)
 Clock Tower (1996 video game)
 Clock Tower II: The Struggle Within
 Clock Tower 3

See also 
 Big Ben
 List of clock towers